Jenaro de Urrutia Olaran was a painter born in Plencia/Plentzia in 1893 and who died in Bilbao on January 2, 1965 (both in Biscay, Spain). He studied his art in Bilbao, Paris and Rome. Mainly known by his mural paintings, landscapes and scenes of local customs of the places he dwelled in.

He was president of the Asociación de Artistas Vascos (Basque Artists' Association) between 1926 and 1929.

His murals can still be seen at St Joseph's Church in Baracaldo, at the Good Shepherd's in Lutxana-Barakaldo and in St Marina's of Bilbao. The Bilbao Fine Arts Museum and Vitoria Fine Arts Museum of Vitoria also host works by Jenaro de Urrutia.

1893 births
1965 deaths
Basque painters
20th-century Spanish painters
20th-century Spanish male artists
Spanish male painters
Landscape artists